is a series of fifteen 1-minute shorts broadcast by NHK between May 2007 and 2008.  Intended as companion pieces to the Ani*Kuri program and as filler between regularly scheduled programs, the shorts were broadcast in three seasons of 5 episodes. Each short was directed by a different director and the episodes were collected and uploaded to the official Ani*Kuri15 website in 2008.

Episodes

Season 1
"Attack of Higashimachi 2nd Borough" (Shinji Kimura: Studio 4°C) - Three aliens come to a cardboard Earth to invade.
 (Akemi Hayashi: Gainax) - A sad young girl recovers from a heartache.
 (Yasufumi Soejima: Gonzo) - A groups of native warriors attack a giant kami in the shape of a bear. The kami sets one of the warriors on fire spiritually.
"Sancha (The Aromatic Tea) Blues" (Osamu Kobayashi: Madhouse) - An avaricious record-store owner watches greedily as patrons look through his records.
 (Shōjirō Nishimi: Studio 4°C) - Hiroshi tries to read his manga but a small robot is shooting pellets to distract him so the robot can escape.

Season 2
"Project Mermaid" (Mamoru Oshii: Production I.G) - A fish turns into a mermaid who swims out into post-apocalyptic city.
"Yurururu ~Nichijou Hen~" (Kazuto Nakazawa: Studio 4°C) - An animator spends the whole day animating a 1-second clip of a giant fish in a city.
"Gyrosopter" (Ranji Murata and Tatsuya Yabuta: Gonzo) - A young gyrosopter pilot visits a pool of water and remembers a gyrosopter battle and the death of a friend on a watery planet.
"Wandaba Kiss" (Atsushi Takeuchi: Production I.G) - A young boy and his dog initiate a complex Rube Goldberg machine in order to steal a kiss from a young girl.
 (Tobira Oda and Yasuyuki Shimizu: Studio 4°C) - A super hero comic book character and Tomoo's idol from Tobira Oda's manga, Danchi Tomoo. Who has his meal stolen by a cat after being attacked by a villain (his master's daughter). Then he imagine about his master (Paul) scaring the cats. Then he falls into a river, and chased by his sidekick (The Bear and The Crow) and drifts over a waterfall.

Season 3
 (Makoto Shinkai: CoMix Wave Films) - The family cat (Chobi) has had his tail stepped on one too many times and dreams of revenge.
 (Mahiro Maeda: Gonzo) - A magical girl and her doll must defeat an invading horde of air pirates.
"Okkakekko" (Michael Arias: Studio 4°C) - A group of children run across fields and play with a giant scary robot.
"Project Omega" (Shōji Kawamori: Satelight) - As an alien force hurtles toward NHK headquarters in Tokyo, the NHK building springs to life as an evangelion-transformer to battle the foe.
 (Satoshi Kon: Madhouse) - A young girl gets up from bed and sleepily tries to awaken herself.

See also
Japan Animator Expo

References

External links
Ani*Kuri program - Japanese Wikipedia article on the regularly scheduled program in which the Ani*Kuri15 shorts appeared.
Official website (Archived)

Gainax
Gonzo (company)
Madhouse (company)
NHK
Production I.G
Studio 4°C